Nogometni klub Britof, commonly referred to as NK Britof, is a Slovenian football club from Britof, established in 1988. The team competes in the Upper Carniolan League, the fourth level of the Slovenian football system.

Honours

Slovenian Fifth Division
 Winners: 2011–12

References

External links
Official website 

Football clubs in Slovenia
Association football clubs established in 1988
1988 establishments in Slovenia